Auxiliary polynomial is a term in mathematics which may refer to:

 The auxiliary function argument in transcendence theory
 The characteristic polynomial of a recurrence relation